Phaea monostigma is a species of beetle in the family Cerambycidae. It was described by Haldeman in 1847, originally under the genus Oberea. It is known from the United States.

References

monostigma
Beetles described in 1847